The Evangelical Lutheran Church in Chile (IELCH : Iglesia Evangélica Luterana en Chile) is a Lutheran denomination in Chile. The church has 2,500 members in 13 parishes. It has been a member of the Lutheran World Federation since 1955 and is also a member of the World Council of Churches and the Latin American Council of Churches. Its president is Bishop Izani Bruch.

References

External links 
Iglesia Evangélica Luterana en Chile official website
Lutheran World Federation listing
World Council of Churches listing

Lutheran denominations
Lutheranism in Chile
Lutheran World Federation members